Rosokhach (ancient name – ) is a small village (selo) in the Stryi Raion, Lviv Oblast (province) of Western Ukraine. It belongs to Kozova rural hromada, one of the hromadas of Ukraine.
Area of the village totals is 1,613 km2 and the population of the village is about 523 people. Local government is administered by Rosokhachska village council.

Geography 
The village is located deep of the Carpathian Mountains of Ukraine within the limits of the Eastern Beskids, on the northern slopes of the Mountain Ridge Dovzhky.
The village is located on the river bank Zavadka, which flows into the Stryi river on the territory of the Sambir Raion.

History and attractions 
The first written mention of the village Rosochach was from 1561, during the colonization of Skole District in the 16th century.

Until 18 July 2020, Rosokhach belonged to Skole Raion. The raion was abolished in July 2020 as part of the administrative reform of Ukraine, which reduced the number of raions of Lviv Oblast to seven. The area of Skole Raion was merged into Stryi Raion.

In the village, there is an architectural monument of local importance of Stryi Raion. It is a wooden church St. of Archangel Michael, 1882.

References

External links 
  Церква Св. Арх. Михайла 1882. 
  Прадідівська слава, с.Росохач 
 weather.in.ua

Literature 
 Історія міст і сіл УРСР : Львівська область, Росохач. – К. : ГРУРЕ, 1968 р. Page 719 
 «Каталог річок України» — Видавництво АН УРСР, Київ, 1957. 

Villages in Stryi Raion
1561 establishments in Europe
Populated places established in 1561